The Indian Journal of Nephrology is a peer-reviewed open-access medical journal published on behalf of the Indian Society of Nephrology. The journal publishes articles on the subject of nephrology.

Abstracting and indexing 
The journal is indexed in Abstracts on Hygiene and Communicable Diseases, CAB Abstracts, EBSCO, Excerpta Medica/EMBASE, Expanded Academic ASAP,  Global Health,  Health & Wellness Research Center, Health Reference Center Academic, INDMed, MedIND, PubMed, Scopus, SIIC databases, and Tropical Diseases Bulletin.

External links 
 

Nephrology journals
Open access journals
Quarterly journals
English-language journals
Medknow Publications academic journals
Publications established in 1991
Academic journals associated with learned and professional societies of India
1991 establishments in India